Ciaran Parker (born 5 October 1995) is an English rugby union player. He plays as a prop for English Premiership Rugby club London Irish.

Professional career

Sale Sharks
Parker made his full debut for Sale on 17 January 2015, when he was used as a replacement in their 2014–15 Champions Cup Round 5 defeat at the hands of French side Clermont Auvergne. For the 2016–17 season, he was dual-registered with Championship side Yorkshire Carnegie.

Munster
Parker joined Irish Pro14 and European Rugby Champions Cup side Munster on a one-year development contract in August 2017. Though Parker has previously represented England at underage level (he was part of the under-20's side that won the 2015 under-20 Six Nations), he was qualified to play for Ireland. Parker made his competitive debut for Munster on 1 September 2017, coming off the bench against Benetton in round 1 of the 2017–18 Pro14.

He extended his development contract with Munster for a further season in March 2018, and made his Champions Cup debut for the province on 9 December 2018, featuring off the bench in their 30–5 win against French pool 2 opponents Castres. He signed a contract extension with Munster in February 2019, a deal that saw Parker progress to a senior contract for the 2019–20 season.

Jersey Reds
After being released by Munster, Parker joined RFU Championship side Jersey Reds ahead of the 2020–21 season.

Loan to Leinster
Parker joined Irish province Leinster, who play in the United Rugby Championship and Champions Cup, on a three-month loan in September 2020.

London Irish
Parker joined Premiership Rugby club London Irish, where former Munster head coach Declan Kidney is the current director of rugby, in October 2021.

References

External links
Premiership Rugby Profile

Pro14 Profile
Munster Profile
U20 Six Nations Profile
Leinster Profile

1995 births
Living people
People educated at St. Ambrose College
Alumni of Manchester Metropolitan University
Rugby union players from Stockport
English rugby union players
Sale Sharks players
Leeds Tykes players
Munster Rugby players
Jersey Reds players
Leinster Rugby players
London Irish players
Rugby union props